The Royal Brunei Police Force, RBPF ( (PDB) is in charge of keeping law and order in Brunei. The RBPF has been one of the 190 members of INTERPOL, an intergovernmental organisation worldwide since 1984.

With a force of more than 4,400 officers, the RBPF is responsible for keeping law and order and providing law enforcement services. The mandate for the RBPF in keeping the law in the Sultanate of Brunei Darussalam includes the prevention, detection and investigation of crime, collection of criminal intelligence, traffic control, escort duties (VIPs, cash, prisoners), sea and border patrol, public order, riot as well as public event control.

History

Organisation structure 
1. Commissioner

(The Secretariat Office of the Police Commissioner)

2. Deputy Commissioner

Departments

1. General Administration and Finance Department

The department consists of 4 units:

i) General Administration and Finance Division

ii) Training Unit

iii) Membership and Career Planning Division

iv) Purchasing and Supply Unit

2. Logistics DepartmentLogistics Department roles & responsibilities:

i) To ensure sufficient needs for the team.

ii) To protect the assets of the team.

iii) To provide technical assistance.

iv) To prepare the Country's Development Plan Project.

v) To prepare the Annual Budget.

3. Criminal Intelligence Department

Functions and Roles:

i) To provide timely and accurate criminal intelligence.

ii) To provide crime statistics and daily crime report.

iii) To prepare threat assessments and intelligence reports among others on crime situation, national events, state visits by VVIPs and many more.

iv) To monitor and analyse local and international affairs which may pose a security threat to the country.

v) To issue security passes and process crime-scene films and photographs.
4. Criminal Investigation DepartmentFunctions & Roles

i) To enforce law and order of the country

ii) To provide service to the community

iii) To prevent crime

iv) To apprehend offenders

v) To conduct investigations on cases relating to offences breaking the law and acts.

5. Operations Department

The Operations Department of the Royal Brunei Police Force is responsible on all aspects of operations in the areas of security and control aside from playing the role of enforcing the laws of the nation.

6. Traffic Control and Investigation Department

The roles of this department are quite diverse, among them are:

i) To investigate and charge road traffic offenders.

ii) To conduct operations and road enforcements.

iii) To provide required assistance to road users while patrolling.

iv) To conduct road safety campaign and awareness programmes.

v) To provide motorcycle escort and other escort services to local and foreign VVIP.

Police sub-divisions

1. Brunei and Muara District Police

2. Tutong District Police

3. Belait District Police

4. Temburong District Police

5. Police Training Centre

Ranks

Equipment

Police Museum Gallery 
On 4 February 2009, the RBPF officially opened the Police Museum Gallery in conjunction to its 88th anniversary.

See also 
 Gurkha Reserve Unit

References

External links 
 
 RBPF hosts 'dzikir' ceremony
 'Do your part to improve road safety'
 RBPF celebrates 88th anniversary

Law enforcement agencies of Brunei
National Central Bureaus of Interpol
Government agencies of Brunei